The vice presidents of the Court of Appeal of Hong Kong are senior justices of appeal who have been appointed by the chief judge of the High Court of Hong Kong to preside over certain divisions of the Court of Appeal. Originally, there were only two vice presidents, dealing with the criminal division and civil division respectively. This later grew to three to include a mixed division, and occasionally up to four to help ease the burden of workload on each vice president.

Role and responsibilities 
The vice-presidents usually preside over an appeal hearing unless the chief judge is sitting, then the chief judge presides. From an order of precedence standpoint, they are more senior than regular justices of appeal and often are given some administrative responsibilities by the chief judge. However, from a judicial judgement standpoint, vice presidents, like the Chief Judge, are the same as any Justice of Appeal and do not possess any greater power during appeals.

List of vice presidents

References 

Hong Kong articles needing expert attention
Hong Kong judges
Appellate court judges
Court of Appeal (Hong Kong)